Chipstead may refer to:
 Chipstead, Kent
 Chipstead, Surrey